Ayyıldız (star and crescent) is a Turkish compound word consisting of ay (crescent) and yıldız (star). It may refer to:

 Ay-yıldız, the national emblem of Turkey
 Ayyıldız, Oltu, a neighborhood in Oltu district of Erzurum, Turkey
 Ay-Yıldız Stadium, a stadium in Karabük, Turkey
 Crescent Star Party (Turkey), a Turkish political party 
 Şilan Ayyıldız (born 1999), Turkish female middle-distance runner